Andrey Vladimirovich Malanichev (born January 10, 1977, in Moscow) — Honored Master of sports of Russia in powerlifting, Elite Pro Powerlifter, multiple champion of World, Europe, Russia, the only person who set 12 absolute All Time World records in all continents: Eurasia, Europe, America, Australia, over 50 records in powerlifting, winner of many international tournaments, over  the fivefold owner of the Cup of the Titans (2008, 2009, 2010, 2012, 2015), two times winner of the most prestigious powerlifting tournament for the biggest total  Big Dogs in Australia 

Andrey was titled as the Best powerlifter by many prestigious sport organisations including PowerliftingWatch.

Career 
Before starting a career in powerlifting he was fond of free style wrestling (competitively) and then competitive amateur boxing.  By the time he got to a real lifting gym at 16 and started to train with his trainer Andrey Chuprin he could bench 80 kg and squat 120 kg.

Andrey twice (2011 and 2014) was named as the strongest lifter in the world according to the authoritative world powerlifting forum PowerliftingWatch.
Andrey was repeatedly recognized as a unique athlete and was awarded prestigious awards for his huge contribution to the development of the sports industry and a healthy lifestyle: the winner of the Best Athlete of the Year 2015 according to the WRPF, the Best Athlete of the Year 2018 according to the Russian Powerlifting Union, as well as the winner of the first national FIT AWARDS 2017

During his career, Andrey has set more than 50 world records and have competed all over the world as well as get the World Champion Title, including Russia, Asia, Europe, USA and Australia.

Powerlifting 

 squat,  bench press,  deadlift.

Malanichev totals  raw.

References 

Russian powerlifters
1977 births
Living people
Sportspeople from Moscow Oblast